Lewis Bay is a bay indenting the north coast of Ross Island, Antarctica, between Mount Bird and Cape Tennyson.

History
The bay was charted by the British National Antarctic Expedition under Robert Falcon Scott, 1901–04. It was named by the Advisory Committee on Antarctic Names in 1964 for Captain Price Lewis, commanding officer of the  during the US Navy's Operation Deep Freeze in 1959, and who in 1963 and 1964 was assistant chief of staff and ship group commander of the US Naval Support Force in Antarctica.

Air crash

On 28 November 1979 an Air New Zealand aircraft carrying 257 people on a sightseeing flight to Antarctica crashed on the side of Mount Erebus, killing everyone aboard and scattering bodies and aircraft debris on the slopes above the bay.  Not all the bodies were subsequently recovered.

Antarctic Specially Protected Area
An area above Lewis Bay, on the lower slopes of Mount Erebus and extending to the coast, is protected as Antarctic Specially Protected Area No.156 because it has been declared a tomb in order to ensure that the area be left in peace. The declaration was made as a mark of respect and sympathy with the relatives of those who died in the 1979 crash, and with the Government and people of New Zealand, in remembrance and in order to protect the site's emotional values.

Historic site
A stainless steel cross was erected in January 1987 on a rocky promontory 3 km from the 1979 crash site as a mark of respect and in remembrance of those who died. The cross has been designated a Historic Site or Monument (HSM 73), following a proposal by New Zealand to the Antarctic Treaty Consultative Meeting.

References

Bays of Ross Island
Antarctic Specially Protected Areas
Historic Sites and Monuments of Antarctica